Psilocarphus is a genus of flowering plants in the tribe Gnaphalieae within the family Asteraceae.

Psilocarphus is known commonly as woolly marbles or woollyheads. It is native western North America and southern South America.

 Species
 Psilocarphus brevissimus  - BC ALB SAS WA OR CA NV ID UT WY MT, Baja California, Chile, Argentina
 Psilocarphus chilensis  - CA, Chile
 Psilocarphus elatior  - BC WA OR CA ID MT
 Psilocarphus globiferus - Chile, Argentina
 Psilocarphus oregonus  - CA OR WA NV ID, Baja California
 Psilocarphus tenellus - BC CA OR WA ID MT, Baja California

 formerly included
Psilocarphus caulescens Benth.- Hesperevax caulescens (Benth.) A.Gray

References

External links
 USDA Plants Profile

Asteraceae genera
Gnaphalieae